Anand Milk Union Limited (abbreviated as Amul) is an  acronym of the Indian state government owned dairy based cooperative society named Gujarat Milk Marketing Federation based in Anand, Gujarat. It is under the ownership of  Gujarat Cooperative Milk Marketing Federation Limited, Department of Cooperation, Government of Gujarat. It is controlled by 3.6 million milk producers within the city. 

Tribhuvandas Kishibhai Patel founded the organisation in 1946 and served as its chairman until his retirement in the 1970s. He hired Verghese Kurien in 1949, initially as the general manager, where Kurien guided the technical and marketing efforts of the cooperative. Kurien briefly became the chairman of Amul following Patel's death in 1994 and is credited with the success of Amul's marketing.

Amul spurred India's White Revolution, which made the country the world's largest producer of milk and milk products, and has since ventured into overseas markets.

History

Amul was formed on 19 December 1946 as a response to the exploitation of small dairy farmers by traders and agents. At the time, milk prices were arbitrarily determined, giving Polson an effective monopoly in milk collection from Kaira and its subsequent supply to Mumbai.

Frustrated with the trade practices (which they perceived as unfair), the farmers of Kaira, led by Tribhuvandas Patel, approached Sardar Vallabhbhai Patel, who advised them to form a cooperative. If they did so, they would be able to directly supply their milk to the Bombay Milk Scheme instead of working for Polson. Sardar Patel sent Morarji Desai to organise the farmers. 

Following a meeting in Chaklasi, the farmers formed the cooperative and resolved not to provide Polson with any more milk. Milk collection was decentralised, as most producers were marginal farmers who could deliver, at most, 1–2 litres of milk per day. Cooperatives were formed for each village. By June 1948, the KDCMPUL had started pasteurising milk for the Bombay Milk Scheme. Then Prime Minister Lal Bahadur Shastri visited Anand to inaugurate Amul's cattle feed factory. On 31 October 1964, and organisation in the village and spoke to farmers about their cooperative after returning to Delhi, he set in motion the creation of an organisation, the National Dairy Development Board (NDDB), to replicate the Kaira cooperative in other parts of India. Under the leadership of Tribhuvandas Patel, in 1973, Amul celebrated its 25th Anniversary with Morarji Desai, Maniben Patel, and Verghese Kurien.

The cooperative was further developed through the efforts of Verghese Kurien and H. M. Dalaya. Dalaya's innovation of making skim milk powder from buffalo milk was a technological breakthrough that revolutionised India's organised dairy industry.

With Kurien's help, the process was expanded on a commercial scale which led to the first modern dairy cooperative at Anand. This cooperative would go on to compete against established players in the market.

The success of the trio T. K. Patel, Kurien, and Dalaya's at the cooperative's dairy soon spread to Anand's neighborhood in Gujarat. Within a short span, five unions in other districts – Mehsana, Banaskantha, Baroda, Sabarkantha, and Surat – were set up, following the approach sometimes described as the Anand pattern.

In 1970, it spearheaded the "White Revolution" of India. To combine forces and expand the market while saving on advertising and avoiding competing against each other, the Gujarat Co-operative Milk Marketing Federation Ltd., an apex marketing body of these district cooperatives, was set up in 1973. The Kaira Union, which had the brand name Amul with it since 1955, transferred it to GCMMF. Technological developments at Amul have subsequently spread to other parts of India.

In 1999, it was awarded the "Best of all" Rajiv Gandhi National Quality Award.

The GCMMF is the largest food products marketing organisation in India. It is the apex organisation of the dairy cooperatives of Gujarat. It is the exclusive marketing organisation for products under the brand name Amul and Sagar.
For more than five decades, dairy cooperatives in Gujarat have created an economic network that links more than 3.1 million (3.1 million) village milk products with crores of consumers in India. In 2007, Gujarat Cooperative Milk Marketing Federation Ltd crossed US$1 billion in its sales turnover and entered the elite club of food companies having this distinction from India. In one more major achievement, the dairy cooperatives of Gujarat under the GCMMF fold crossed milk procurement of 10 million kgs. per day mark on 27 December 2007, which is the highest ever milk procurement achieved by any dairy network in India, be it private or cooperative. The entire quantity of milk received was accepted without any milk holidays and was processed successfully into milk and other milk products.

In 2018, Amul inaugurated a new chocolate plant in Mogar, Anand near their headquarters, with Prime Minister Narendra Modi in attendance. The new plant has been built with an increased capacity of 1,000 tonnes per month against the earlier 250 tonnes a month capacity. GCMMF has invested around ₹3 billion in this project. It is a fully automated production factory with minimal human intervention.

UHT products and impact

Amul's portfolio has experienced a growth rate of 53% over the years. Long-life UHT products for urban populations, like Amul Taaza, which are packed in Tetra Pak cartons undergo ultra-heat treatment to remove all harmful micro-organisms while retaining the nutrition in the milk. Amul sells around – litres of UHT milk and other value-added products per day. Further, forecasts this demand to be continue growing at 25%. The UHT products have allowed Amul to become the leader in the packaged milk segment without the requirement of maintaining a cold supply chain.

Advertising

In 1966, Amul hired Sylvester daCunha, the managing director of an advertising agency to design an ad campaign for Amul Butter. DaCunha designed a campaign consisting of a series of hoardings featuring topical ads related to day-to-day issues. It was popular and earned a Guinness World Record for the longest-running ad campaign in the world. In the 1980s, cartoon artist Kumar Morey and scriptwriter Bharat Dabholkar had been involved in sketching the Amul ads; the latter rejected the trend of using celebrities in advertisement campaigns. Dabholkar credited chairman Verghese Kurien with creating a free atmosphere that fostered the development of the ads.

Despite encountering political pressure on several occasions, DaCunha's agency has made it a policy of not backing down. Some of the more controversial Amul ads include one commenting on the Naxalite uprising in West Bengal, on the Indian Airlines employees' strike, and one depicting the Amul girl wearing a Gandhi cap.

In 2013, Amul tweeted a picture featuring the Amul butter girl, implying that "freedom of choice" died in 2013, in opposition to the Supreme Court of India overruling the judgment of the Delhi High Court and criminalising homosexuality again.

On 17 October 2016, Amul butter girl celebrated 50 years since she first appeared in the topical ad, titled "Thoroughbread". The ad showed a jockey holding a slice of bread during the horse race season in 1966. The impish Amul girl had appeared for the first time even before that, with Eustace Fernandez showing her offering bedtime prayers with a wink and a lick of lips, saying "Give us this day our daily bread: with Amul butter".

Their Ad on Aagey Badhta Hai India had an excellent response from the audience. It spoke about how their Milk is seen as a household product with a catchy tune associated with it. It has over 39 lakh (~4 million) views on YouTube.

In February 2020, Amul posted a picture of the Amul girl treating Joaquin Phoenix with butter after his academy award win for his role in the 2019 film, Joker. Since Phoenix is a vegan, Amul faced criticism from vegans in India and PETA for the poor knowledge of his vegan activism and life.

Amul posted a picture of its mascot Butter Girl celebrating with PV Sindhu for winning the bronze medal in Women's singles Badminton tournament at the Tokyo Olympics in August 2021.

In popular culture
The establishment of Amul is known as the White Revolution.

The White Revolution inspired filmmaker Shyam Benegal to base his 1976 film Manthan on it. The film was financed by over five lakh (half a million) rural farmers in Gujarat who contributed ₹2 each to its budget. Upon its release, these farmers went in truckloads to watch 'their' film, making it a commercial success. Manthan'' won the National Film Award for Best Feature Film in Hindi during the 24th National Film Awards
in 1977.

Recognition 
In August 2019, Amul became the first Indian dairy company to enter Rabobank's Global Top 20 Dairy Companies list.

See also 
 Aavin 
 Anikspray

References

External links

 

Cooperatives in Gujarat
Food and drink companies established in 1946
Companies based in Gujarat
Ice cream brands
Economy of Gujarat
Dairy products companies of India
Indian brands
Indian companies established in 1946
Dairy cooperatives in India
Brand name dairy products
Dairy farming in India
Agricultural cooperatives in India